Industrial engineering is an engineering profession that is concerned with the optimization of complex processes, systems, or organizations by developing, improving and implementing integrated systems of people, money, knowledge, information and equipment. Industrial engineering is central to manufacturing operations. 

Industrial engineers use specialized knowledge and skills in the mathematical and social sciences, together with the principles and methods of engineering analysis and design, to specify, predict, and evaluate the results obtained from systems and processes. There are several industrial engineering principles followed in the manufacturing industry to ensure the effective flow of the systems, processes and operations. This includes Lean Manufacturing, Six Sigma, Information Systems, Process Capability and Define, Measure, Analyze, Improve and Control (DMAIC). These principles allow the creation of new systems, processes or situations for the useful coordination of labor, materials and machines and also improve the quality and productivity of systems, physical or social. Depending on the subspecialties involved, industrial engineering may also overlap with, operations research, systems engineering, manufacturing engineering, production engineering, supply chain engineering, management science, management engineering, financial engineering, ergonomics or human factors engineering, safety engineering,  logistics engineering or others, depending on the viewpoint or motives of the user.

History

Origins

Industrial engineering  
There is a general consensus among historians that the roots of the industrial engineering profession date back to the Industrial Revolution.  The technologies that helped mechanize traditional manual operations in the textile industry including the flying shuttle, the spinning jenny, and perhaps most importantly the steam engine generated economies of scale that made mass production in centralized locations attractive for the first time.  The concept of the production system had its genesis in the factories created by these innovations.  It has also been suggested that perhaps Leonardo da Vinci was the first industrial engineer because there is evidence that he applied science to the analysis of human work by examining the rate at which a man could shovel dirt around the year 1500. Others also state that the industrial engineering profession grew from Charles Babbage’s study of factory operations and specifically his work on the manufacture of straight pins in 1832 . However, it has been generally argued that these early efforts, while valuable, were merely observational and did not attempt to engineer the jobs studied or increase overall output.

Specialization of labor 

Adam Smith's concepts of Division of Labour and the "Invisible Hand" of capitalism introduced in his treatise The Wealth of Nations motivated many of the technological innovators of the Industrial Revolution to establish and implement factory systems.  The efforts of James Watt and Matthew Boulton led to the first integrated machine manufacturing facility in the world, including the application of concepts such as cost control systems to reduce waste and increase productivity and the institution of skills training for craftsmen.

Charles Babbage became associated with industrial engineering because of the concepts he introduced in his book On the Economy of Machinery and Manufacturers which he wrote as a result of his visits to factories in England and the United States in the early 1800s.  The book includes subjects such as the time required to perform a specific task, the effects of subdividing tasks into smaller and less detailed elements, and the advantages to be gained from repetitive tasks.

Interchangeable parts 
Eli Whitney and Simeon North proved the feasibility of the notion of interchangeable parts in the manufacture of muskets and pistols for the US Government.  Under this system, individual parts were mass-produced to tolerances to enable their use in any finished product.  The result was a significant reduction in the need for skill from specialized workers, which eventually led to the industrial environment to be studied later.

Pioneers 
Frederick Taylor (1856–1915) is generally credited as being the father of the industrial engineering discipline.  He earned a degree in mechanical engineering from Stevens Institute of Technology and earned several patents from his inventions.  His books, Shop Management and The Principles of Scientific Management, which were published in the early 1900s, were the beginning of industrial engineering.  Improvements in work efficiency under his methods was based on improving work methods, developing of work standards, and reduction in time required to carry out the work.  With an abiding faith in the scientific method, Taylor did many experiments in machine shop work on machines as well as men. Taylor developed "time study" to measure time taken for various elements of a task and then used the study observations to reduce the time further. Time study was done for the improved method once again to provide time standards which are accurate for planning manual tasks and also for providing incentives.

The husband-and-wife team of Frank Gilbreth (1868–1924) and Lillian Gilbreth (1878–1972) was the other cornerstone of the industrial engineering movement whose work is housed at Purdue University School of Industrial Engineering.  They categorized the elements of human motion into 18 basic elements called therbligs.  This development permitted analysts to design jobs without knowledge of the time required to do a job. These developments were the beginning of a much broader field known as human factors or ergonomics.

In 1908, the first course on industrial engineering was offered as an elective at Pennsylvania State University, which became a separate program in 1909 through the efforts of Hugo Diemer. The first doctoral degree in industrial engineering was awarded in 1933 by Cornell University.

In 1912, Henry Laurence Gantt developed the Gantt chart, which outlines actions the organization along with their relationships. This chart opens later form familiar to us today by Wallace Clark.

With the development of assembly lines, the factory of Henry Ford (1913) accounted for a significant leap forward in the field. Ford reduced the assembly time of a car from more than 700 hours to 1.5 hours. In addition, he was a pioneer of the economy of the capitalist welfare ("welfare capitalism") and the flag of providing financial incentives for employees to increase productivity.

In 1927, the then Technische Hochschule Berlin was the first German university to introduce the degree.  The course of studies developed by Willi Prion was then still called Business and Technology and was intended to provide descendants of industrialists with an adequate education. 

Comprehensive quality management system (Total quality management or TQM) developed in the forties was gaining momentum after World War II and was part of the recovery of Japan after the war.

The American Institute of Industrial Engineering was formed in 1948. The early work by F. W. Taylor and the Gilbreths was documented in papers presented to the American Society of Mechanical Engineers as interest grew from merely improving machine performance to the performance of the overall manufacturing process, most notably starting with the presentation by Henry R. Towne (1844–1924) of his paper The Engineer as An Economist (1886).

Modern practice 
From 1960 to 1975, with the development of decision support systems in supply such as material requirements planning (MRP), one can emphasize the timing issue (inventory, production, compounding, transportation, etc.) of industrial organization. Israeli scientist Dr. Jacob Rubinovitz installed the CMMS program developed in IAI and Control-Data (Israel) in 1976 in South Africa and worldwide.

In the 1970s, with the penetration of Japanese management theories such as Kaizen and Kanban, Japan realized very high levels of quality and productivity.  These theories improved issues of quality, delivery time, and flexibility.  Companies in the west realized the great impact of Kaizen and started implementing their own continuous improvement programs. W. Edwards Deming made significant contributions in the minimization of variance starting in the 1950s and continuing to the end of his life. 

In the 1990s, following the global industry globalization process, the emphasis was on supply chain management and customer-oriented business process design. The theory of constraints, developed by Israeli scientist Eliyahu M. Goldratt (1985), is also a significant milestone in the field.

Comparison to other engineering disciplines 
Engineering is traditionally decompositional. To understand the whole of something, it is first broken down into its parts. One masters the parts, then puts them back together to create a better understanding of how to master the whole. The approach of industrial and systems engineering (ISE) is opposite; any one part cannot be understood without the context of the whole system. Changes in one part of the system affect the entire system, and the role of a single part is to better serve the whole system.

Also, industrial engineering considers the human factor and its relation to the technical aspect of the situation and all of the other factors that influence the entire situation, while other engineering disciplines focus on the design of inanimate objects.

"Industrial Engineers integrate combinations of people, information, materials, and equipment that produce innovative and efficient organizations. In addition to manufacturing, Industrial Engineers work and consult in every industry, including hospitals, communications, e-commerce, entertainment, government, finance, food, pharmaceuticals, semiconductors, sports, insurance, sales, accounting, banking, travel, and transportation."

"Industrial Engineering is the branch of Engineering most closely related to human resources in that we apply social skills to work with all types of employees, from engineers to salespeople to top management. One of the main focuses of an Industrial Engineer is to improve the working environments of people – not to change the worker, but to change the workplace."

"All engineers, including Industrial Engineers, take mathematics through calculus and differential equations. Industrial Engineering is different in that it is based on discrete variable math, whereas all other engineering is based on continuous variable math. We emphasize the use of linear algebra and difference equations, as opposed to the use of differential equations which are so prevalent in other engineering disciplines. This emphasis becomes evident in optimization of production systems in which we are sequencing orders, scheduling batches, determining the number of materials handling units, arranging factory layouts, finding sequences of motions, etc. As, Industrial Engineers, we deal almost exclusively with systems of discrete components."

Etymology

Etymology
While originally applied to manufacturing, the use of industrial in industrial engineering can be somewhat misleading, since it has grown to encompass any methodical or quantitative approach to optimizing how a process, system, or organization operates. In fact, the industrial in industrial engineering means the industry in its broadest sense. People have changed the term industrial to broader terms such as industrial and manufacturing engineering, industrial and systems engineering, industrial engineering and operations research, industrial engineering and management.

Sub-disciplines 
Industrial engineering has many sub-disciplines, the most common of which are listed below. Although there are industrial engineers who focus exclusively on one of these sub-disciplines, many deals with a combination of them such as supply chain and logistics, and facilities and energy management.

Methods engineering

Facilities engineering & energy management

Financial engineering

Energy engineering

Human factors & safety engineering

Information systems engineering & management

Manufacturing engineering

Operations engineering & managementOperations research & optimization

Policy planning

Production engineeringQuality & reliability engineering

Supply chain management & logistics

Systems engineering & analysis

Systems simulation

Related disciplines

Organization development & change management

Behavioral economics

Education 
Industrial engineers study the interaction of human beings with machines, materials, information, procedures and environments in such developments and in designing a technological system.

Industrial engineering degrees accredited within any member country of the Washington Accord enjoy equal accreditation within all other signatory countries, thus allowing engineers from one country to practice engineering professionally in any other.

Universities offer degrees at the bachelor, masters, and doctoral level.

Undergraduate curriculum 

In the United States, the undergraduate degree earned is either a bachelor of science (B.S.) or a bachelor of science and engineering (B.S.E.) in industrial engineering (IE). In South Africa, the undergraduate degree is a bachelor of engineering (BEng). Variations of the title include Industrial & Operations Engineering (IOE), and Industrial & Systems Engineering (ISE or ISyE). 

The typical curriculum includes a broad math and science foundation spanning chemistry, physics, mechanics (i.e., statics, kinematics, and dynamics), materials science, computer science, electronics/circuits, engineering design, and the standard range of engineering mathematics (i.e., calculus, linear algebra, differential equations, statistics). For any engineering undergraduate program to be accredited, regardless of concentration, it must cover a largely similar span of such foundational work – which also overlaps heavily with the content tested on one or more engineering licensure exams in most jurisdictions.

The coursework specific to IE entails specialized courses in areas such as optimization, applied probability, stochastic modeling, design of experiments, statistical process control, simulation, manufacturing engineering, ergonomics/safety engineering, and engineering economics. Industrial engineering elective courses typically cover more specialized topics in areas such as manufacturing, supply chains and logistics, analytics and machine learning, production systems, human factors and industrial design, and service systems.

Certain business schools may offer programs with some overlapping relevance to IE, but the engineering programs are distinguished by a much more intensely quantitative focus, required engineering science electives, and the core math and science courses required of all engineering programs.

Graduate curriculum 

The usual graduate degree earned is the master of science (MS), master of science and engineering (MSE) or master of engineering (MEng) in industrial engineering or various alternative related concentration titles.

Typical MS curricula may cover:

 Manufacturing Engineering
 Analytics and machine learning
 Computer-aided manufacturing
 Engineering economics
 Financial engineering
 Human factors engineering and ergonomics (safety engineering)
 Lean Six Sigma
 Management sciences
 Materials management
 Operations management
 Operations research and optimization techniques
 Predetermined motion time system and computer use for IE
 Product development
 Production planning and control
 Productivity improvement
 Project management
 Reliability engineering and life testing
 Robotics
 Statistical process control or quality control
 Supply chain management and logistics
 System dynamics and policy planning
 Systems simulation and stochastic processes
 Time and motion study
 Facilities design and work-space design
 Quality engineering
 System analysis and techniques

Differences in teaching 
While industrial engineering as a formal degree has been around for years, consensus on what topics should be taught and studied differs across countries. For example, Turkey focuses on a very technical degree while Denmark, Finland and the United Kingdom have a management focus degree, thus making it less technical. The United States, meanwhile, focuses on case studies, group problem solving and maintains a balance between the technical and non-technical side.

Practicing engineers 
Traditionally, a major aspect of industrial engineering was planning the layouts of factories and designing assembly lines and other manufacturing paradigms. And now, in lean manufacturing systems, industrial engineers work to eliminate wastes of time, money, materials, energy, and other resources.

Examples of where industrial engineering might be used include flow process charting, process mapping, designing an assembly workstation, strategizing for various operational logistics, consulting as an efficiency expert, developing a new financial algorithm or loan system for a bank, streamlining operation and emergency room location or usage in a hospital, planning complex distribution schemes for materials or products (referred to as supply-chain management), and shortening lines (or queues) at a bank, hospital, or a theme park.

Modern industrial engineers typically use predetermined motion time systems, computer simulation (especially discrete event simulation), along with extensive mathematical tools for modeling, such as mathematical optimization and queueing theory, and computational methods for system analysis, evaluation, and optimization. Industrial engineers also use the tools of data science and machine learning in their work owing to the strong relatedness of these disciplines with the field and the similar technical background required of industrial engineers (including a strong foundation in probability theory, linear algebra, and statistics, as well as having coding skills).

See also

Related topics

Associations 

 
 
 
 
 

 

 

 Washington Accord

Notes

Further reading
 Badiru, A. (Ed.) (2005).  Handbook of industrial and systems engineering. CRC Press. .
 B. S. Blanchard and Fabrycky, W. (2005).  Systems Engineering and Analysis (4th Edition).  Prentice-Hall. .
 Salvendy, G. (Ed.) (2001).  Handbook of industrial engineering: Technology and operations management. Wiley-Interscience. .
 Turner, W. et al. (1992). Introduction to industrial and systems engineering (Third edition). Prentice Hall.  .
 Eliyahu M. Goldratt, Jeff Cox (1984). The Goal  North River Press; 2nd Rev edition (1992). ; 20th Anniversary edition (2004) 
 Miller, Doug, Towards Sustainable Labour Costing in UK Fashion Retail (February 5, 2013). 
 Malakooti, B. (2013). Operations and Production Systems with Multiple Objectives. John Wiley & Sons.

 Systems Engineering Body of Knowledge (SEBoK)
 Traditional Engineering
 Master of Engineering Administration (MEA)
 Kambhampati, Venkata Satya Surya Narayana Rao (2017). "Principles of Industrial Engineering" IIE Annual Conference. Proceedings; Norcross (2017): 890-895.

External links
 

 
Engineering disciplines
Manufacturing
Operations research